Khun Thein Pe (born 28 October 1966) is a Burmese politician currently serving as a House of Nationalities MP for Shan State № 9 constituency.

In the 2010 Myanmar general election, he was elected as a Pyithu Hluttaw MP for Hopong parliamentary constituency . He is a member of Pa-O National Organisation.

Early life and education
He was born on 28 October 1966 in Taunggyi Township, Shan State , Burma(Myanmar) and graduated with B.Sc(Botany) from Yangon University. His previous job was Pyithu Hluttaw MP.

Political career
He is a member of the Pa-O National Organisation. In the Myanmar general election, 2015, he was elected as an Amyotha Hluttaw MP, winning a majority of 150651 votes and elected representative from Shan State № 9 parliamentary constituency  .

References

Members of the House of Nationalities
Pa-O National Organisation politicians
1966 births
Living people
People from Shan State